The 2013 Family Circle Cup was a women's tennis event in the 2013 WTA Tour. It took place from March 30 to April 7, 2013. It was the 41st edition of the tournament and a Premier level tournament. The event was hosted at the Family Circle Tennis Center, on Daniel Island, Charleston, United States. It was the only event of the clay courts season played on green clay.

Points and prize money

Point distribution

Prize money
The total commitment prize money for this year's event was $795,707

Singles main draw entrants

Seeds

1 Rankings as of March 18, 2013.

Other entrants 
The following players received wildcards into the main draw:
  Bethanie Mattek-Sands
  Andrea Petkovic 
  Taylor Townsend
  Caroline Wozniacki

The following players received entry from the qualifying draw:
  Eugenie Bouchard
  Mallory Burdette
  Nastassja Burnett
  Caroline Garcia
  Vania King
  Grace Min
  Jessica Pegula
  Teliana Pereira

Withdrawals 
 Before the tournament
  Petra Cetkovská
  Sara Errani (thigh injury)
  Polona Hercog
  Lucie Hradecká
  Kaia Kanepi
  Pauline Parmentier
  Ksenia Pervak
  Elena Vesnina
  Lourdes Domínguez Lino
  Heather Watson (left adductor injury)
 During the tournament
  Anabel Medina Garrigues (right knee injury)
  Andrea Petkovic (right calf injury)

Retirements 
 During the tournament
  Tamira Paszek (left neck injury)
  Samantha Stosur (right calf strain)

Doubles main draw entrants

Seeds

1 Rankings are as of March 18, 2013.

Other entrants
The following pairs received wildcards into the doubles main draw:
  Jaklin Alawi /  Dominika Kaňáková
  Jelena Janković /  Andrea Petkovic
The following pair received entry as alternates:
  Marina Erakovic /  Jessica Pegula

Withdrawals
 Before the tournament
  Anabel Medina Garrigues (right knee injury)

Champions

Singles

 Serena Williams def.  Jelena Janković, 3–6, 6–0, 6–2

Doubles

 Kristina Mladenovic /  Lucie Šafářová def.  Andrea Hlaváčková /  Liezel Huber 6–3, 7–6(8–6)

References

External links
Official Website

Family Circle Cup
Family Circle Cup
Family Circle Cup
Family Circle Cup
Charleston Open